"Dangerous" is a song written and performed by British singer–songwriter Sarah Joyce, known by her stage name as Rumer, for her third studio album Into Colour (2014). It was released on 22 September 2014 and differs from most of her songs for its disco style and upbeat tone. The song was well received by critics and peaked at number 36 on the Japan Hot 100.

Composition
Joyce explained that "Dangerous" was about her fear of re-entering the music industry following bipolar disorder, post-traumatic stress disorder and ADHD, only translated to a love song: "I had so much resistance to going back into writing and performing publicly again that I realised I wasn't going to be able to break through it until I literally wrote a song about the resistance itself." She songs on the song, "It's taken me a long time to feel better babe / I've only just begun to feel my heart again." Helen Brown, a writer for The Daily Telegraph, suggested the line "You want me to let go/ You want me to lose control/ But I don't want to lose control," was a response to "critics who find her too smooth and safe." Musically, "Dangerous" is an uptempo, 1970s-inspired disco pop track that includes strings, jazz-esque bass, and a funk guitar section in its instrumentation, and the song differs from most of her music for being upbeat and disco-tinged.

Critical reception
Glasswerk called "Dangerous" an "instant classic." Tom Ingham praised Joyce's vocal performance as her "most colourful and charged" to date. The Observer critic Paul Mardles, labeling most of Into Colour as "flat" and "forgettable," found "Dangerous" to be the album's most memorable track for its disco style. Writer Paul John, however, criticized it for being a "slightly dishonest representation of the remainder of the album," but nonetheless called it "a wonderful song in and of itself." The Daily Express described it as a "smooth and sexy hommage to the elegant days of early disco. Less 'sweaty dancefloor' and more 'martinis and mirrorballs.' Just the way we like it."

Music video
On 15 October 2014, a video for the song "Dangerous" was released. Directed by Anthony Byrne and produced by Jess Bell, the video depicts a manager for a ballet company who crushes on a male ballet dancer.

Personnel
Adapted from the liner notes of Into Colour:

Written and sung by Sarah Joyce
Backing vocals by Porter Carroll and Sharon Bryant
Production, writing, arrangement, conducting, bass, piano, organ, percussion, additional programming, and engineering by Rob Shirakbari
Also written by Rick Nowels and Stephen Bishop
Recorded at Electric Lady Studios and Frisbie Studios in New York City, Water Studios in Hoboken, New Jersey, and RAK Studios in London
Alto saxophone by Lisa Graheme
Baritone and tenor saxophone by Derek Nash
Bass by Zev Katz
Cello by Dave Daniels, Ian Burdge, Martin Loveday, and Richard Harwood
Drums and percussion by Ash Soan
Guitar by Paul Pesco
Trombone by Winston Rollins 
Trumpet by Chris Storr and Martin Shaw 
Viola by Bill Hawkes, Bruce White, Maxine Moore, and Nick Barr 
Violin by Alison Dods, Chris Tombling, Emlyn Singleton, Everton Nelson, Ian Humphries, Magnus Johnstone, Mark Berrow, Matt Ward, Natalia Bonner, Patrick Kiernan, Rita Manning, and Steve Morris
Strings recorded and engineered by Geoff Foster
Mixed by Michael H. Brauer at Electric Lady Studios
Assistant mixing and Pro Tools engineering by Mark Bengtson
Also engineered by Mike Horner, Richard Woodcraft, Sean Kelly, John Horne), and Steve Vealey
Mastered by Bob Ludwig

Release history

Charts

References

2014 songs
Rumer (musician) songs
Songs written by Rumer (musician)
Songs written by Rick Nowels